Albuquerque Indian School (AIS) was a Native American boarding school in Albuquerque, New Mexico, which operated from 1881 to 1981. It was one of the oldest and largest off-reservation boarding schools in the United States. For most of its history it was run by the Bureau of Indian Affairs (BIA). Like other government boarding schools, AIS was modeled after the Carlisle Indian Industrial School, using strict military-style discipline to strip students of their native identity and assimilate them into white American culture. The curriculum focused on literacy and vocational skills, with field work components on farms or railroads for boys and as domestic help for girls. In the 1930s, as the philosophy around Indian education changed, the school shifted away from the military approach and offered more training in traditional crafts like pottery, weaving, and silversmithing.

In 1977, administration of the school was taken over by the All Indian Pueblo Council, a coalition of the 20 Pueblos in New Mexico and Texas. By this point the campus was in disrepair and it closed soon afterward. Most of the abandoned school buildings burned down and were razed between 1981 and 1993.  the sole remaining building is the Employees' New Dormitory and Club.

History
The school opened in 1881 in an adobe hacienda in Duranes, a village just north of Albuquerque which was later absorbed by the city. It was operated by the Presbyterian Board of Home Missions under contract to the Department of the Interior and had an initial enrollment of 40. In 1882, the school moved to its permanent site at 12th Street and Indian School Road. By 1884, the enrollment was 158. It became directly operated by the BIA in 1886. In 1925, the school expanded from primary grades to high school, and enrollment peaked at about 1,400 students in the 1930s.

Enrollment declined, with prospective students instead enrolling in on- or near-reservation public schools, after the 1953 Indian Termination Act. Following the Indian Self-Determination Act of 1975, the All Indian Pueblo Council (AIPC), a coalition of the 20 Pueblos in New Mexico and Texas, requested and was awarded a contract to operate the school starting in the 1977–78 school year. AIS thus became the first BIA school to be transferred to local tribal control. By this point the campus was in poor condition and the AIPC began advocating to move its students to the Santa Fe Indian School campus instead. The BIA agreed to the move after 22 students had to be treated for carbon monoxide poisoning due to a faulty furnace in early 1981. The merger into Santa Fe Indian School was completed later in the year and AIS ceased to exist as an independent entity.

Post-closure
After the school closed, the campus was abandoned. In 1984, the property was transferred from the BIA to the AIPC, which still owned it as of 2002. Between 1981 and 1993, nearly all of the school buildings were destroyed by a series of fires. At least 29 separate fires occurred, with 16 in 1987 alone. Most of the fires were suspected to have been started intentionally. When the last school building burned down in 1993, witnesses saw six men leaving the scene. The only building to survive was Building 232, the Employees' New Dormitory and Club, which was across the street from the main part of the campus. This building was renovated in 2013 to house the Native American Community Academy charter school.

In 2009 the city government and the Indian Pueblos Federal Development Corporation created an agreement on possible development of the site.

There was a plaque that commemorated Native American children who attended in the 1800s who disappeared. In 2021 the plaque disappeared.

In July 2021, The Paper reported on the rediscovery of the site of the Albuquerque Indian School's cemetery. Jonathan Sims' investigation was prompted by the recent discoveries of multiple mass graves associated with historical sites of residential schools in Canada. 4-H Park, across the street from where the Indian Pueblo Cultural Center is now located, used to have a plaque that explained that this park had previously been a burial site for Zuni, Navajo, and Apache students of the school. Ed Tsyitee, a groundskeeper employed by the school, had maintained this cemetery until his retirement in 1964. A later article, according to Sims, "claimed the city and AIS agreed to seed and plant trees in the area to not draw attention to the site." The Paper's report also sites an article published in the Albuquerque Journal on Saturday, October 6, 1973. This 1973 article says that workers installing a sprinkler system had uncovered remains while working in the park.

Campus

The AIS campus occupied a  site near 12th Street and Indian School Road in the Near North Valley neighborhood. At the time the school closed, it comprised 44 buildings.

Three of the school buildings were listed on the National Register of Historic Places:
Employees' New Dormitory and Club (Building 232), built in 1931
Gymnasium-Auditorium Building (Building 210), built in 1923
University of New Mexico Lodge (Building 219), built in 1917

The latter two buildings burned down and were removed from the register.

Student body
Most AIS students came from the Pueblos and the Navajo Nation. In 1887, the student body was 77% Pueblo, 5% Navajo, and 18% from other groups including Mescalero Apache, Tohono Oʼodham, and Pima. By 1904 the makeup was 61% Pueblo, 36% Navajo, 2% Apache, and 1% from other groups. Starting in the 1950s, the number of Pueblo students sharply decreased as these students began attending on-reservation day schools instead. In 1960, the school's population of around 1,000 students was 87% Navajo and only 12% Pueblo.

In 1968, 12 Native Americans from the Ramah, New Mexico area went to Albuquerque Indian School.

Sports
AIS competed in the New Mexico Activities Association. The school won state championships in baseball (1941 and 1976), boys' basketball (1928), and boys' track and field (1928).

The 1928 basketball team compiled a 26–1 record to earn the state title and traveled to Chicago to compete in the national championship tournament hosted by the University of Chicago. However, the team lost both of their games in the tournament.

References

Further reading

External links

 

Native American boarding schools
Albuquerque, New Mexico
Boarding schools in New Mexico
Public boarding schools in the United States
Native American history of New Mexico
Educational institutions established in 1881
1980s disestablishments in New Mexico
Educational institutions disestablished in 1981